Daniel James McDonnell (born September 15, 1988) is an American professional volleyball player. A bronze medalist at the 2018 World Championship. At the professional club level, he plays for Arkas İzmir.

Honours

Clubs
 CEV Challenge Cup
  2016/2017 – with Chaumont VB 52

 National championships
 2014/2015  French SuperCup, with Tours VB
 2014/2015  French Cup, with Tours VB
 2014/2015  French Championship, with Tours VB
 2016/2017  French Championship, with Chaumont VB 52
 2017/2018  Polish Cup, with Trefl Gdańsk
 2021/2022  Turkish Cup, with Arkas İzmir

External links

 
 Player profile at PlusLiga.pl 
 Player profile at Volleybox.net

1988 births
Living people
Sportspeople from Glendale, Arizona
American men's volleyball players
American expatriate sportspeople in Brazil
Expatriate volleyball players in Brazil
American expatriate sportspeople in France
Expatriate volleyball players in France
American expatriate sportspeople in Poland
Expatriate volleyball players in Poland
American expatriate sportspeople in Turkey
Expatriate volleyball players in Turkey
UC Irvine Anteaters men's volleyball players
Tours Volley-Ball players
Trefl Gdańsk players
Middle blockers